The eighty-fifth Minnesota Legislature first convened on January 3, 2007. The 67 members of the Minnesota Senate and the 134 members of the Minnesota House of Representatives were all elected during the General Election on November 7, 2006.

Sessions 
The legislature met in regular session beginning January 3, 2007 and ending May 21, 2007. A bill passed on February 22 requires the state to generate a significant amount of its energy needs from renewable sources.

A special session was convened September 11, 2007 to pass legislature relating to floods in southeast Minnesota and the I-35W Mississippi River bridge.

The legislature re-convened for regular session on February 12, 2008 and adjourned in May.

Party summary 
Resignations and new members are discussed in the "Membership changes" section, below.

Senate

House of Representatives

Leadership

Senate 
President of the Senate
James Metzen (DFL-South St. Paul)

Senate Majority Leader
Lawrence Pogemiller (DFL-Minneapolis)

Senate Minority Leader
David Senjem (R-Rochester)

House of Representatives 
Speaker of the House
Margaret Anderson Kelliher (DFL-Minneapolis)

House Majority Leader
Anthony Sertich (DFL-Chisholm)

House Minority Leader
Marty Seifert (R-Marshall)

Members

Senate

House of Representatives

Membership changes

Senate

House of Representatives

Notes

External links 
Senate election results
House election results

85th
Minnesota
2000s in Minnesota
2008 U.S. legislative sessions
2007 in Minnesota
2008 in Minnesota